Sophia Fenwick (born 12 December 1992) is a New Zealand netball player. Fenwick was a member of the New Zealand Secondary Schools and New Zealand U21 teams in 2010. She was also drafted as a Temporary Replacement Player for the Canterbury Tactix in the 2010 ANZ Championship season, before being offered a contract with the Southern Steel for 2011.

Fenwick attended Rangi Ruru Girls' School.

References

1992 births
New Zealand netball players
Mainland Tactix players
Southern Steel players
Living people
People educated at Rangi Ruru Girls' School
ANZ Championship players
National Netball League (New Zealand) players